Benjamin Hjertstrand (born 22 January 1994) is a Swedish football defender who plays for Halmstads BK.

References

1994 births
Living people
Swedish footballers
Association football defenders
Falu FK players
Dalkurd FF players
IK Brage players
Örebro SK players
Ettan Fotboll players
Superettan players
Allsvenskan players